Padmaavat is a 2018 Indian Hindi-language epic period drama film directed and produced by Sanjay Leela Bhansali. The film stars Deepika Padukone as Rani Padmavati, Shahid Kapoor as Maharawal Ratan Singh and Ranveer Singh as Sultan Alauddin Khilji and features Aditi Rao Hydari, Jim Sarbh, Raza Murad, and Anupriya Goenka in supporting roles. The film's screenplay was written by Bhansali and Prakash Kapadia. Bhansali also composed the soundtrack of the film, with lyrics written by A. M. Turaz, Siddharth-Garima and Swaroop Khan. The original score of the film is composed by Sanchit Balhara. Padmaavat was edited by Rajesh G. Pandey while Sudeep Chatterjee is its cinematographer. Set in medieval Rajasthan in 1303 AD, Queen Padmavati of Mewar is married to a noble king and they live in a prosperous fortress with their subjects until an ambitious Sultan hears of Padmavati's beauty and becomes obsessed with having her.

The film won 25 awards from 68 nominations; its music, and the performance of Singh have received the most attention from award groups.

At the 66th National Film Awards, Padmaavat earned three awards – Best Music Direction, Best Male Playback Singer and Best Choreography. At the 64th Filmfare Awards, Padmaavat received 18 nominations, winning four awards – Best Actor (Critics), Best Music Director, Best Female Playback Singer and Best Choreography. At the 2018 Screen Awards, Padmaavat was nominated in four categories, winning Best Actor, Best Female Playback and Best Choreography. Padmaavat also won two awards at the 20th ceremony of the International Indian Film Academy Awards – Best Actor and Best Supporting Actress. At the 2019 Zee Cine Awards ceremony, the film won four awards – Best Actor, Best Actress, Best Director and Best Choreography. The film garnered twenty-one nominations at the 11th Mirchi Music Awards and won eight awards, including Song of The Year and Album of The Year. It also received five nominations for Best Film, Best Director, Best Actress and Best Actor for both Singh and Kapoor at the Indian Film Festival of Melbourne, but did not win any of the awards.

Accolades

See also 
 List of Bollywood films of 2018

Notes

References

External links 
 Accolades for Padmaavat at the Internet Movie Database

Lists of accolades by Indian film